P. K. Mishra (13 January 1943 – 19 December 2008) was an Indian Hindustani poet and lyricist. He penned  numerous hit songs such as Dil Hai Chhota Sa, Jaan Se Pyaara Hai Hindustan Hamara etc. He has written 316 songs in 61 Hindi films.

Career
Mishra started his career in 1992 with the film Roja which was composed by A. R. Rehman. He penned the Hindi version of all the songs of the Tamil tunes. He wrote "Dil Hai Chhota Sa" and "Bharat Humko Jaan Se Pyaara Hai", both earned immense popularity. He went on to write lyrics for Tamil and Telugu dubbed Hindi movies and hindi versions of popular tunes composed by A. R. Rehman, Ilaiyaraaja, Vidyasagar, M. M. Keeravani etc. He has written lyrics for films such as Hindustani (2003), Hamse Hai Muqabala (1993), Thalapathi (1991), My Brother Nikhil (2005), Saza-e-Kalapani', Duniya Dilwalon Ki, Viswa Vidhata, Mukhbiir etc. He introduced lyricist Raqueeb Alam to A. R. Rehman at the recording of Roja, who went on to sing songs for Rehman in several films.

Death
He died at a city hospital in Chennai at the age of 65.

Filmography
Dalpati (1991)
Pyaar Ka Saawan (1991)
Bandhu (1992)
Aadmi (1993)
Roja (1993)
Bhairav Dweep (1994)
Dharam Yoddha (1994)
Mera Pyaara Bharat (1994)
Mere Humsafar (1994)
Priyanka (1994)
Aaj Ka Romeo (1995)
Chor Chor (1995)
Humse Hai Muqabla (1995)
Muthu Maharaja (1995)
Shri Satyanarayan Vrat Katha (1995)
Velu Naayakan (1995)
Chhaila (1996)
Duniya Dilwalon Ki (1996)
Hindustani (1996)
Love Birds (1996)
Maa Ki Shakti (1996)
Maun (1996)
Pehli Nazar Mein (1996)
Sazaa-E-Kalapani (1996)
Tu Hi Mera Dil (1996)
Sajna Doli Leke Aana (1997)
Vishwa Vidhaata (1997)
Kanoon Ka Khiladi (1998)
Shaitano Ka Honeymoon (1998)
Mr. Romeo (1999)
Aaj Ka Ravan(2000)
Sanam Tere Hain Hum (2000)
Sant Gyaneshwar (2000)
Mujhe Pyaar Hua Tumse (2001)
Vaishnovi Maa Ki Mahima (2001)
16 December (2002)
Aaj Ka Deviputra (2002)
Badmash No. 1 (2002)
Mitr My Friend (2002)
Sherni Ka Shikar (2002)
Mahima Kaashi Vishwanath Ki (2003)
Kiss Kis Ko (2004)
Mission Azad (2004)
Tauba Tauba (2004)
Dharma - The Warrior (2005)
My Brother... Nikhil (2005)
Ghamandee (2005)
Main Hoon Soldier (2007)
Naya Jigar (2007)
Taaqat (2007)
Meri Jung: One Man Army (2007)
Sivaji: The Boss (2007)
Coolie - The Real Baazigar (2008)
Great Dharmatma (2008)
Meri Izzat (2008)
Mukhbiir (2008)
The Return of Tezaab (2003)
Dham Dhoom (2009)
Karm Aur Dharm (2009)
The Return of Khakee (2009)

References

External links 
 

Indian male poets
Urdu-language poets from India
Indian lyricists
Hindi-language lyricists
Indian male songwriters
Indian Hindus
2008 deaths
1943 births
20th-century Indian poets
Poets from Rajasthan
20th-century Indian male writers